Major George Gavin (1810 – 23 October 1880) was an Irish Independent Irish Party and Liberal politician.

Gavin was first elected MP as an Independent Irish representative for Limerick City at a by-election in February 1858 but was unseated under three months later due to bribery through his agent.

He was re-elected for the seat as Liberal representative in 1859 and held the seat until he stood down in 1874.

He served as High Sheriff of Limerick City in 1857.

References

External links
 

1810 births
1880 deaths
High Sheriffs of Limerick City
Irish Liberal Party MPs
Members of the Parliament of the United Kingdom for County Limerick constituencies (1801–1922)
UK MPs 1857–1859
UK MPs 1859–1865
UK MPs 1865–1868
UK MPs 1868–1874